Mariano Di Vaio is an Italian blogger, fashion designer and actor. He has been a brand ambassador for Hugo Boss, Dolce & Gabbana and Calvin Klein. His first published book is My Dream Job. He launched his line of jewels, MDV Jewels, a collection of shoes, MDV Shoes, and his Eyewear collection, MDV Eyewear. The first movie he appeared in is Deported, a Hollywood production by Yoram Globus.

Career
Di Vaio at the age of eighteen left Italy to pursue his acting and modeling careers, working one year as a model in London, and then studying acting at NYFA (New York Film Academy) in New York City.

In 2016, Di Vaio published his first book, the biography My Dream Job.

Personal life
In September 2015, he married Eleonora Brunacci in Castello di Procopio.

Television
In the autumn of 2016, Mariano Di Vaio (with the dancer Stefano De Martino) was one of the tutors/mentors in the first season of Selfie – Le cose cambiano, the Italian talent show produced by Fascino PGT of Maria De Filippi and aired by Canale 5 with Simona Ventura as presenter.

Filmography

References

External links
 Official website

1989 births
Living people
People from Assisi
Italian bloggers
Male bloggers
Italian fashion designers